Burkhard Beins (born 1964 in Lower Saxony, West Germany) is a German composer/performer who works with percussion, selected objects and electronics.

Living in Berlin since 1995, Beins is active in experimental music and electroacoustic improvisation.

Since the late 1980s he has appeared on international festivals, concerts and tours throughout Europe and overseas. He is a member of several ensembles like Perlonex, Activity Center, Polwechsel, Trio Sowari, Phosphor, The Sealed Knot, BBB and also works with Keith Rowe, Sven-Åke Johansson, John Tilbury, Charlemagne Palestine and many others. At the same time Beins is also active in the area of sound installation.

He has released more than 30 CDs and LPs on labels like 2:13 Music, Zarek, Erstwhile Records, Hat Hut, Potlatch, Mikroton Recordings, Absinth or Confront. His first solo CD, Disco Prova, was released in 2007, followed by Structural Drift, both combining field recordings, percussion material and electronic devices with digital multitracking.

Selected discography
 Activity Center: Lohn & Brot (Absinth CD, 2010)
 Beins, Capece, Davies, Nakamura: SLW (Org. Music from Thessaloniki CD, 2009)
 Burkhard Beins: Structural Drift (Künstlerhäuser Worpswede CD, 2009)
 Phosphor II (Potlatch CD, 2009)
 Polwechsel & John Tilbury: Field (Hat Hut, CD 2009)
 Perlonex & Charlemagne Palestine: It Ain't Necessarily So (Zarek 2CD, 2009)
 Trio Sowari: shortcut (Potlatch, CD 2008)
 Burkhard Beins: Disco Prova (Absinth, CD 2007)
 Perlonex. Tensions w/Keith Rowe + Charlemagne Palestine (Nexsound 2CD, 2006)
 Polwechsel: Archives of the North (Hat Hut, CD 2006)
 Baghdassarians/Baltschun/Beins (Absinth Records, CD 2006)
 Trio Sowari: Three Dances (Potlatch CD 105, 2005)
 Activity Center & Phil Minton (Absinth Records, CD 2005)
 Keith Rowe/Burkhard Beins: Live at Amplify (ErstLive oo1, CD 2004)
 The Sealed Knot: Unwanted Object (Confront Collectors Series 1, CD 2004)
 Berlin Drums - 4 Solos: Beins/Buck/Heather/Schaefer (4 x 3" CDR, Absinth, 2004)
 Beins/Marwedel/Vorfeld: Misiiki (Rossbin CD o13, 2003)
 Beins/Johansson: Santa Fé (...im Raumschiff Zitrone Berlin) (LP, Eventuell 02, 2003)
 The Sealed Knot:  Surface/Plane (Meniscus CD o12, 2003)
 Burkhard Beins/Andrea Neumann: Lidingö (Erstwhile CD o26, 2002)
 Phosphor (Potlatch P501 CD, 2002)
 Perlonex: Peripherique (CD, Zarek 07, 2001)
 Burkhard Beins/Keith Rowe: Grain (CD, Zarek 06, 2001)
 Burkhard Beins/John Bisset: Chapel (2:13 Music CD o12, 2001)
 Activity Center: Möwen & Moos (2:13 Music CD oo8/oo9, 1999, limited edition)
 Yarbles (Hatology 510, CD 1997)
 Nunc (2:13 Music CD oo2, 1996)

References

External links
Official site

Electroacoustic improvisation
Free improvisation
German experimental musicians
Living people
1964 births
Musicians from Lower Saxony